Wellington Silva Sanches Aguiar (born 6 February 1992), known as Wellington Nem, is a Brazilian professional footballer who plays as a forward.

Club career
Born in Rio de Janeiro, Brazil, Nem began his professional career at Fluminense. He was loaned out to Figueirense in 2011. His time at the club was very successful. He scored nine times from a second striker position and was awarded the best newcomer of the 2011 Brazilian league, beating Bruno Cortes and Leandro Damião. Upon the expiration of his loan he was returned to the first team at Fluminense.

In his first season at Fluminense, Nem played mostly as a left winger or second striker and managed six goals and eight assists in 34 appearances in an impressive first full season at the club. In the 2013 season, Nem scored two and assisted two more in the first part of the season.

Wellington Nem signed a five-year deal with Ukrainian giants Shaktar Dontesk for a fee believed to be around €8 million in mid-2013. His first season at Shakhtar was a huge disappointment. A lot was expected of the player but he spent most of the campaign on the sideline either injured or benched, playing just 140 minutes of football the whole 2013–14 season and scoring a solitary goal. The next season started similarly, with Nem left off the sides Champions League list and playing just once in the first 13 rounds of the Premier Liga.

Following 2017, Nem is going to play, on loan, for Brazilian side São Paulo FC, in the Brazilian League.

Wellington Nem's professional career took off when Mano Menezes selected him in the pre-list for the 2012 Summer Olympics.

Career statistics

Club

International

Honours

Club
Fluminense
Taça Guanabara: 2012
Campeonato Brasileiro Série A: 2012
Campeonato Carioca: 2012

Shakhtar Donetsk
Ukrainian League: 2013–14, 2017–18, 2018–19
Ukrainian Cup: 2015–16, 2017–18, 2018–19
Ukrainian Super Cup: 2014, 2015

Fortaleza
Campeonato Cearense: 2021

Individual
Campeonato Brasileiro Série A Best Newcomer: 2011

References

External links
 Wellington Nem featured in Brazil: the talent factory 2011
 
 Football Lineups Profile

1992 births
Living people
Footballers from Rio de Janeiro (city)
Brazilian footballers
Association football midfielders
Brazil youth international footballers
Brazil international footballers
Brazilian expatriate footballers
Expatriate footballers in Ukraine
Campeonato Brasileiro Série A players
Campeonato Brasileiro Série B players
Fluminense FC players
Figueirense FC players
São Paulo FC players
Fortaleza Esporte Clube players
Cruzeiro Esporte Clube players
Ukrainian Premier League players
FC Shakhtar Donetsk players
Brazilian expatriate sportspeople in Ukraine
Primeira Liga players
F.C. Arouca players
Brazilian expatriate sportspeople in Portugal